The Santana 30/30 is an American sailboat that was designed by Bruce Nelson and Bruce Marek as a Midget Ocean Racing Club (MORC) racer-cruiser and first built in 1981.

Production
The design was built by W. D. Schock Corp in Corona, California, United States, starting in 1981, but it is now out of production.

Design
The Santana 30/30 is a recreational keelboat, built predominantly of fiberglass, with wood trim. It has a masthead sloop rig, a raked stem, a raised reverse transom, an internally mounted spade-type rudder controlled by a tiller and a fixed fin keel.

The design's galley is split with a two-burner alcohol stove and sink on the starboard side and the icebox on the port side, doubling as a navigation table. The head is located forward, just aft of the bow "V"-berth, and includes a hanging locker. Additional sleeping accommodation includes two cabin berths, plus separate dinette settees. There is a large hatch forward.

The mainsheet traveler is mid-cockpit, the halyards are internally-mounted and there are four winches. The Cunningham is a 3:1 arrangement, which the foreguy is 2:1 and the boom vang is 12:1. The boom has two flattening reefs and an internal outhaul and topping lift. The genoa tracks and toe rails are made from aluminum.

The design has a PHRF racing average handicap of 141.

Operational history
Reviewer Richard Sherwood wrote of the design, "this Santana was designed to the MORC rule. Displacement is moderate. The bow is fine and the transom broad. The over-hanging transom reduces length and wetted surface in light air, increasing water line as heeled. She is a performance cruiser, with the emphasis on performance.

Bill Brockaway noted in Sailing World, "the GP, with its lower cabin and fewer interior amenities, is the model you want for racing. A typical PHRF rating for the Santana 30/30 GP is 114, and the boat is raced with six crew."

Variants
Santana 30/30PC (Performance Cruiser)
This model was introduced in 1981 and about 40 were completed. It displaces  and carries  of ballast.
Santana 30/30PC II
This model was introduced as an update. It has a Yanmar diesel engine, the chainplates relocated outboard to allow the #3 jib to be sheeted inside the shrouds, lowered cabin settee to provide more headroom and angle brackets used to reinforce the interior bulkheads.
Santana 30/30GP (Grand Prix)
This model was introduced in 1983 and about 40 were completed also. It has a lighter deck, displaces  and carries  of ballast. Starting in 1985 all boats built used eliptical rudders and keels. Some boats have open transoms.

See also
List of sailing boat types

Similar sailboats
Aloha 30
C&C 1/2 Ton
C&C 30
C&C Mega 30 One Design
Catalina 30
CS 30
Hunter 30
Hunter 30T
Hunter 30-2
J/30
Kirby 30
Leigh 30
Mirage 30 SX
Nonsuch 30
Pearson 303
S2 9.2
Southern Cross 28

References

Keelboats
1980s sailboat type designs
Sailing yachts
Sailboat types built by W. D. Schock Corp
Sailboat type designs by Bruce Nelson
Sailboat type designs by Bruce Marek